Shin Young-Jun  (born 6 September 1989) is a South Korean footballer who plays as a forward for Busan IPark.

External links 

1989 births
Living people
Association football forwards
South Korean footballers
Jeonnam Dragons players
Pohang Steelers players
Gangwon FC players
Gimcheon Sangmu FC players
Busan IPark players
Korea National League players
K League 1 players
K League 2 players